Hossein Pour Amini  is an Iranian midfielder who currently plays for Iranian football club Paykan in the Persian Gulf Pro League.

Club career statistics

References

1990 births
Living people
Mes Rafsanjan players
Pars Jonoubi Jam players
Association football forwards
Iranian footballers